The Ziadie family is a family residing in Jamaica, where they were prominent merchants. A branch of the family now resides in the United States and its members have become successful horse trainers. They are the descendants of half a dozen Greek Orthodox brothers who emigrated from Lebanon.

Lady Colin Campbell, previously Georgia Ziadie, is descended from this family through her father, department store owner Michael George Ziadie. She claims that the Ziadies are a wealthy and well known family in Jamaica. The opera director Sir Peter Jonas was her cousin.

References

Jamaican Christians
Jamaican families
Jamaican people of Lebanese descent
Jamaican Maronites